Cloudreach is a cloud computing consultancy, focused on the implementation and operational support of public cloud services, including Amazon Web Services, Microsoft Azure and Google Cloud Platform. It is headquartered in London, UK, and has offices in multiple countries around the world including Canada, France, Germany, India, The Netherlands, United States and Switzerland.

Publicly acknowledged customers include BP, Hearst, the Met Office, Skyscanner, Ströer and Time Inc. Cloudreach also owns two software systems developed in-house: Sceptre, an infrastructure automation suite for AWS; and Connect, an integration Platform as a Service (iPaaS).

On January 4, 2022, the company was acquired by Atos.

History

 2009: Cloudreach was founded in London by Pontus Noren and James Monico;
 2011: it opened a second office in Edinburgh. In February 2017, Cloudreach was acquired by private equity firm Blackstone for an undisclosed amount.
 2017: in July, Cloudreach announced a partnership with T-Systems, a subsidiary of Deutsche Telekom;
 2017: in August, Cloudreach acquired two US-based businesses: Emerging Technology Advisors, a cloud professional services company; and Cloudamize, a cloud migration specialist. Cloudamize is a cloud computing analytics platform, providing analytics for cloud migration and management;
 2018: in July, Aaron Painter was appointed as CEO of Cloudreach. Pontus Noren subsequently became Vice Chairman of the Board of Directors;
 2018: in August, Cloudreach acquired Relus Cloud, an Atlanta based data and analytics specialist; this took the Cloudreach headcount beyond 700;
 2019: in October, Brooks Borcherding is appointed COO and President and takes the role of interim CEO.

References

External links
 Official website

Cloud computing providers
The Blackstone Group companies
2022 mergers and acquisitions